Phyllonemus is a genus of claroteid catfish native to Africa where it is only found in Lake Tanganyika.

Species 
This genus currently contains three recognized species:
 Phyllonemus brichardi Risch, 1987
 Phyllonemus filinemus Worthington & Ricardo, 1937
 Phyllonemus typus Boulenger, 1906 (Spatula-barbeled catfish)

References 

 
Claroteidae

Catfish genera
Freshwater fish genera
Taxa named by George Albert Boulenger
Taxonomy articles created by Polbot